Chariton's Choir (Greek: Η χορωδία του Χαρίτωνα / I horodia tou haritona) is a 2005 Greek film directed by Grigoris Karantinakis. It was Greece's submission to the 79th Academy Awards for the Academy Award for Best Foreign Language Film, but was not accepted as a nominee.

Plot
The flirtatious headmaster of a school in a small town prepares his pupils for the choirs' Olympics. The arrival of the new army commander in the town, upset the headmaster, as they both fall in love with the same woman.

Cast
George Corraface as Chariton (school's headmaster)
Maria Nafpliotou as Eleni (teacher)
Akilas Karazisis as Dimitriou (army commander)
Christos Stergioglou as Drakos (teacher)

Accolades
Winner:
2005: Greek State Film Awards for Best Film
2005: Greek State Film Awards for Best Sound

Nominated:
2006:Academy Award for Best Foreign Language Film (not nominated)

See also

Cinema of Greece
List of submissions to the 79th Academy Awards for Best Foreign Language Film

References

External links

2005 films
2005 comedy films
2000s Greek-language films
Greek comedy films